The TAI/AgustaWestland T129 ATAK is a twin-engine, tandem seat, multi-role, all-weather attack helicopter based on the Agusta A129 Mangusta platform. The T129 was developed by Turkish Aerospace Industries (TAI) in partnership with Leonardo (AgustaWestland Helicopters). The helicopter is designed for armed reconnaissance and attack missions in hot and high environments and rough geography in both day and night conditions.

The ATAK programme was begun to meet the requirements of Turkish Armed Forces for an armed tactical reconnaissance and an attack helicopter. The T129 is the result of the integration of Turkish-developed avionics, airframe modifications, and weapon systems onto the AgustaWestland A129 airframe, with upgraded engines, transmission and rotor blades. It is in use by the Turkish Army and other services including the Turkish Gendarmerie. The helicopter has a unit cost of roughly US$50 million.

Development

Origins

The ATAK programme was begun to meet the Turkish Armed Forces' requirements for an attack and tactical reconnaissance helicopter.  Turkey announced on 30 March 2007 that it had decided to negotiate with AgustaWestland to co-develop and produce 51 (with 40 options) attack helicopters based on the Agusta A129 Mangusta. It is to be assembled in Turkey by Turkish Aerospace Industries (TAI) as the T129. On 7 September 2007, a $1.2 billion contract was signed.

On 22 June 2008, the agreement between TUSAS Aerospace Industries (TAI) and AgustaWestland formally entered into force. Under the agreement, TAI would develop an indigenous mission computer, avionics, weapons systems, self-protection suites and the helmet-mounting cuing systems. Tusaş Engine Industries (TEI) would manufacture the LHTEC CTS800-4N engines under licence.  Under the agreement, Turkey has full marketing and intellectual property rights for the T129 platform; Turkey can export also the platform to third party nations, excluding Italy and the United Kingdom. However, the T129's LHTEC CTS800-4N gives the United States a veto over any prospective export sales and so Turkey developed its own TEI TS1400 powerplant. About 95% of the initial parts of the serial production T129 are manufactured in Turkey.

On 16 July 2007, the Scientific and Technological Research Council of Turkey (TUBITAK), Meteksan Savunma Sanayii AŞ and Bilkent University formed a consortium to develop an advanced millimetre wave radar (MILDAR), similar to the Longbow and the IAI/ELTA radars, intended to enter service in 2009. MILDAR was successfully completed development in February 2012.

In 2007, it was reported that one helicopter will be kept by the Turkish Ministry of Defense and used as a test-bed for systems development. The remaining 50 helicopters will be delivered to the Turkish Army. An optional 40 further T129 helicopters will be produced if necessary. These 50 T129s are to be designated T129B. In November 2010, Turkey ordered an additional nine T129 helicopters to increase its total ordered to 60. These T129s were for an urgent Turkish Army operational requirement and was built by TAI for delivery in 2012, one year prior to the delivery of the previously ordered 51 helicopters.  These T129s are designated T129A, lacking advanced anti-tank missiles. As a result of delays, the T129As entered service in 2014.

Flight testing

On 28 September 2009, the T129's maiden flight took place when P1 prototype flew at AgustaWestland's facilities in Vergiate, Italy. On 19 March 2010, the first T129 prototype (P1) conducted high altitude hover tests near Verbania, Italy following the completion of several successful test flights. During the hover test, T129 P1 lost its tail rotor at 15,000 feet. Test pilot Cassioli regained enough control to steer away from residential area before crashing; the crew escaped without serious injuries. On 17 August 2011, TAI announced the first successful flight of the T129 prototype "P6", the first of three prototypes to be assembled in Turkey.

In 2013, media reports claimed that the first batch of helicopters delivered to Turkish Army for trials did not meet the requirements of the contract, specifically in terms of "vibration, balance, weight". The T129 was nose-heavy; to resolve this, 137 kg was added to the tail, causing the total weight to exceed the specified requirement. The higher weight may decrease the T129's service ceiling, which is detrimental for operating under hot and high conditions, like those found in Southeastern Anatolia.  The Undersecretariat for Defense Industries will adjust the contract in accordance. Experts expect weight reductions as development continues.

On 22 April 2014, TAI formally delivered the first serial production T129 ATAK to the Turkish Land Forces. Total nine T129 ATAK helicopters of the first batch delivered to the Turkish Land Forces after completing qualification testing.

HAVELSAN developed a simulator system for the T129 and presented at the International Defence Industry Fair (IDEF) 2017.

Design
The T129 ATAK is optimized for "hot and high conditions", performance requirements against challenging geographical and environmental conditions in night and day operations.  It has several key improvements over the original A129 inline with the requirements of the Turkish Army.

The helicopter is equipped with the Hunter Kaska integrated control system specially designed for the helicopter. The system enables the automatic orientation of target detection and weapon systems to the pilot's line of sight with high tracking accuracy. The helicopter is also equipped with a dedicated electro-optical FLIR system ASELFLIR-300T for multi-purpose missions manufactured by the Turkish company Aselsan.

The helicopter also equipped with advanced electronic warfare and countermeasure systems which increase survival capabilities in combat situations. These systems include a Radar Warning Receiver (RIAS), Radar Frequency Mixer (RFKS) and a Laser Receiver (LIAS) in addition to an automatic Countermeasure Firing System (KTAS).

The ATAK can be used in the anti-armour, armed reconnaissance, ground attack, escort, asymmetrical, fire support and short range anti-aircraft roles. The T129 ATAK is equipped with a 20 mm three-barrel rotary cannon in a nose turret with 500 rounds of ammunition. It can also be equipped with up to 8 UMTAS 160 mm long range anti-tank missiles, 76 unguided 70mm rockets for close air support, 16 CIRIT 70 mm missiles and 8 air launched Stinger short range air-to-air missiles.

The helicopter features also include high maneuverability, low visibility, sound and radar silhouette, high impact resistance and ballistic tolerance.

Operational history

Turkey

In May 2014, the Turkish Army formally inducted the first nine T129s into service; these initial rotorcraft were to a less advanced interim EDH A-model variant, intended to replace some of the ageing AH-1s in use prior to the introduction of the more capable T129B variant to service. On 25 April 2015, a pair of T129s were used in combat for the first time in a counter-terrorism operation in Turkey's Siirt Province. Delivery of the final EDH-standard T129s took place on 31 July 2015.

On 10 February 2018, during the Turkish military operation in Afrin, a T129 of the Turkish Army was shot down by Kurdish YPG anti-aircraft fire in Kırıkhan district of Hatay Province. It was later confirmed by the Turkish Armed Forces and President Erdoğan.

Philippines

When the Philippine Air Force (PAF) re-evaluated its capabilities and performance after the siege of Marawi in 2017 against ISIS-inspired terrorists, it found that the MD-520MG Defender and the newer AW-109E Power armed helicopters did not have sufficient firepower. In 2017, the Philippine government received confirmation from the Jordanian government that they would provide two used Bell AH-1S Cobra attack helicopters, with options for more, subject to the decision of the Jordanian government, which further complicated the decision-making process. 

Instead of acquiring more light armed helicopters, the PAF is now interested in purpose-built attack helicopters, even if acquired in smaller quantities. In the end, the PAF's Technical Working Group (TWG) selected the TAI T129 ATAK due to its lower price than its American competitors. TAI was able to offer six T129s for the approved budget, compared to just five AH-1Z Vipers from Bell, or four AH-64E Apaches from Boeing.

The DND had already signed a contract for the acquisition of six T129B helicopters from TAI for Php13.7 billion through a government-to-government deal with the Turkish Ministry of Defense by the second half of 2020.

As of December 2022, a total of four units out of six ordered T129B attack helicopters and their accompanying spare parts and logistical support items have been accepted into service by the Air Force. The last batch of two more helicopters is expected to be completed and delivered by 2023.

Potential operators

Brazil
In September 2018, Brazil showed interest in acquiring T129 with army officials visiting Turkey. In March 2019, ten Brazilian Army pilots received certificates for completing T129 test flights at Forte Ricardo Kirk, Taubaté.

Iraq
In an Iraqi TV broadcast, the Iraqi defense minister announced in August 2021 that Iraq will acquire 12 T129 ATAK helicopters.

Nigeria
According to a statement by the Turkish Aerospace Industries General Manager Temel Kotil during the Farnborough Airshow. Turkish Aerospace Industries (TAI) will provide six T-129 ATAK helicopters to Nigeria under a recent contract.

In January 2023, the Nigerian Air Chief announced that Nigeria will receive 6 T-129 ATAKs by the end of the first quarter of 2023.

Pakistan
In 2017, Pakistan indicated that it was interested in possibly purchasing the T129 ATAK for the Pakistan Army Aviation Corps (PAAC), as a replacement to their ageing Bell AH-1F Cobra gunships; the PAAC had extensively tested the T129 and the Z-10ME in 2016.

In May 2018, Turkey's ruling Justice and Development Party (AK Parti) announced that Pakistan had purchased a batch of 30 T129 helicopters for US$1.5 billion, which Turkish Aerospace Industries (TAI) confirmed in July.

Pakistan's purchase of the T129 was riddled with issues; the United States Department of Defense (DoD) refused to issue the export-license for the LHTEC T800-4A turboshaft engines necessary for the ordered gunships, owing to diplomatic issues between the United States and Turkey. In 2020, Pakistan granted a one-year extension to TAI, to allow the latter to persuade the DoD to issue the required export-license; TAI also approached its sister-company, Tusaş Engine Industries, to develop an indigenous engine for the T129, as a possible replacement for the T800-4A. TAI also hired a U.S-based lobbying firm, Capitol Counsel, to lobby U.S lawmakers to clear the Pakistani deal. In 2021, Pakistan granted a six-month extension to TAI, in a further bid to resolve the issue.

In January 2022, multiple reports of Pakistan cancelling the deal for the 30 T129s, in favor of the Z-10ME emerged. However, the Pakistani military's public relations wing - the Inter-Services Public Relations (ISPR), denied the reports, stating that the deal had not been terminated.

Qatar
In January 2019, it was reported that Qatar had signed a preliminary agreement to buy T129s.

Saudi Arabia
In 2011, Saudi Arabia asked Turkey to enter a tender to produce attack helicopters for the Saudi Air Force.

Failed bids

Morocco
On 31 July 2021, it was reported that Morocco was in the "advanced stage of negotiation" with Turkey for the purchase of 22 T129 ATAK helicopters. Additional sources claimed previous negotiations were suspended in 2018 due to US sanctions.

South Korea
In January 2013, a media report stated that South Korea's attack helicopter competition included the T129 in the final three bidders with the Bell AH-1Z Viper and the Boeing AH-64 Apache. However, the AH-64E Apache was chosen in April 2013.

Variants
T129A EDH (Erken Duhul Helikopteri or Early Delivery Helicopter)
T129A is the "combat support" version equipped with a 20 mm gatling gun and rounds and can carry 70 mm (2.75 in) rockets; nine T129As have been ordered.  Six helicopters have been delivered to the Turkish Army. The T129As are to be upgraded to the T129B standard.

T129B
T129B is the "multi-role" version equipped with electronic warfare systems. 51 helicopters are to be produced, with one to be used as a weapons testbed. The T129B is armed with a 20 mm gatling gun and can carry a payload of maximum 8 UMTAS ATGMs, 16 Cirit missiles, 8 air launched Stinger, 76 70 mm (2.75 in) unguided rockets.

Operators

 Philippine Air Force - 4 aircraft delivered. 2 more on order to be delivered by 2023.

Turkish Land Forces - 57 delivered, with 35 more options (5 Phase-II)
Gendarmerie General Command - 10 delivered out of 24 ordered (4 Phase-II)
General Directorate of Security (Turkey) - 9 for the Aviation Department (All Phase-II)

Specifications (T129 ATAK)

See also

References

External links

 TAI T129 ATAK page
 Leonardo T129 page

Attack helicopters
AgustaWestland aircraft
2000s Turkish military aircraft
ATAK
Twin-turbine helicopters
Aircraft first flown in 2009
Turkish helicopters